John McGhee (5 July 1945 – 1 September 1975) was a Scottish footballer who played for Dumbarton, Stenhousemuir and Stirling Albion.

He emigrated to Australia in 1970, but died in a car crash five years later.

References

1945 births
1975 deaths
Scottish footballers
Dumbarton F.C. players
Stenhousemuir F.C. players
Stirling Albion F.C. players
Scottish Football League players
Association football central defenders
Road incident deaths in New South Wales